"Blues Before and After" is a song by the American alternative rock group The Smithereens. It is the second single released in support of their third album 11.

Formats and track listing 
All songs written by Pat DiNizio
US cassette single (4JM-44516)
"Blues Before and After" – 3:15
"Maria Elena (acoustic version)" – 2:47

Charts

References 

1989 songs
1990 singles
Capitol Records singles
The Smithereens songs
Song recordings produced by Ed Stasium
Songs written by Pat DiNizio
Enigma Records singles